Specimens of Middle Cornish texts are given here in Cornish and English. Both texts have been dated within the period 1370–1410 and the Charter Fragment is given in two Cornish orthographies. (Earlier examples of written Cornish exist but these are the first in continuous prose or verse.)

Background
It was not until the reign of Athelstan that the Cornish kings became subject to the rulers of Wessex: even so the border was established irrevocably on the east bank on the Tamar and in ecclesiastical matters Cornwall was added to the territory of the Bishops of Sherborne. Under Canute it ceased to be subject to the King of England and only later, at an unknown date in Edward the Confessor's reign was annexed again. After the Conquest the Earldom of Wessex was broken up and soon Cornwall was established as a Norman earldom of importance. Cornwall was regarded as a separately named province, with its own subordinated status and title under the English crown, with separate ecclesiastical provision in the earliest phase. There were subsequent constitutional provisions under the Stannary Parliament, which had its origins in provisions of 1198 and 1201 separating the Cornish and Devon tin interests and developing into a separate parliament for Cornwall maintaining Cornish customary law. From 1337, Cornwall was further administered as a 'quasi-sovereign' royal Duchy during the later medieval period.

The implication of these processes for the Cornish language was to ensure its integrity throughout this period. It was until early modern times the general speech of essentially the whole population and all social classes. The situation changed rapidly with the far-reaching political and economic changes from the end of the medieval period onwards. Language-shift from Cornish to English progressed through Cornwall from east to west from this period onwards.

Growth in population continued to a likely peak of 38,000 before the demographic reversal of the Black Death in the 1340s. Thereafter numbers of Cornish speakers were maintained at around 33,000 between the mid-fourteenth and mid-sixteenth centuries against a background of substantial increase in the total Cornish population. From this position the language then inexorably declined until it died out as community speech in parts of Penwith at the end of the eighteenth century.

Linguistic changes
During this middle period, Cornish underwent changes in its phonology and morphology. An Old Cornish vocabulary survives from ca. 1100, and manumissions in the Bodmin Gospels from even earlier (ca. 900). Placename elements from this early period have been 'fossilised' in eastern Cornwall as the language changed to English, as likewise did Middle Cornish forms in Mid-Cornwall, and Late Cornish forms in the west. These changes can be used to date the changeover from Cornish to English in local speechways, which together with later documentary evidence enables the areas within which Cornish successively survived to be identified.

Middle Cornish is best represented by the Ordinalia, which comprise a cycle of mystery plays written in Cornish, it is believed at Glasney College, Kerrier, in west Cornwall, between 1350 and 1450, and performed throughout areas where the language was still extant in open-air amphitheatres (playing-places or 'rounds' - plenys-an-gwary in Cornish) which still exist in many places.

There is also a surviving religious poem Pascon agan Arluth (The Passion of Our Lord) which enable a linguistic corpus of Middle Cornish to be ascertained. Later miracle play compositions include: Beunans Meriasek (the Life of St. Meriadoc) datable to 1504; and William Jordan of Helston's Gwreans an Bys (The Creation of the World). These may hark back to older forms of the language, for other writings in the sixteenth century show the language to have been undergoing substantial changes which brought it into its latest surviving form (Late or Modern Cornish). These writings include John Tregear's translation of Bishop Bonner's 'Homilies' c. 1556.

The Charter Fragment, ca. 1400

The Charter Fragment is a short poem about marriage, believed to be the earliest extant connected text in the language. It was identified in 1877 by Henry Jenner among charters from Cornwall in the British Museum and published by Jenner and by Whitley Stokes.

Manuscript

Kernewek Kemmyn

Translation

1   Listen friend,
2   Do not be shy!
3   Come down and rest
4   and come closer to me
5   if you know what is to your advantage,
6   and I will give you a girl,
7   one who is very beautiful.
8   If you like her,
9   go and get her;
10  take her for your wife.
11  She will not murmur to refuse you
12  and you will have her
13  She will be a good wife
14  to keep house for you.
15  I tell you the complete truth.
16  Go and ask her
17  Now I give her into your hand
18  and on the Creed I swear
19  there is not her equal
20  from here to the Tamar Bridge.
21  I beg you to be good to her
22  and she will all you want,
23  for she is a child and truthful withal.
24  Go and let her have her own way.
25  Before going,
25a have a kiss for me!
26  Go away and be quick!
27  Begin promptly, eagerly. Take care
28  to make him nervous
29  so that he dare not
30  oppose you at all.
31  If he bids you do something,
32  say to yourself, "I never will."
33  Say to him "I will do it if you wish."
34  For all he can, he will do nothing.
35  Then he will esteem you as Mistress
36  and Lady as long as you live.
37  He was troubled, by the Mass.
38  Courteous and kind is he
39  He will not do you any harm
40  If you (can) enthral him
41  hold him tightly so!

Pascon agan Arluth—The Passion Poem—Mount Calvary

Pascon agan Arluth ('The Passion of our Lord'), a poem of 259 eight-line verses probably composed around 1375, is one of the earliest surviving works of Cornish literature. Five manuscripts are known to exist, the earliest dating to the 15th century.

References

Middle Cornish literature
Christianity in Cornwall